No. 307 (Polish) Squadron, also known as No. 307 (City of Lwów) Squadron was one of several Polish squadrons in the Royal Air Force (RAF) during the Second World War. It was formed as part of an agreement between the Polish Government in Exile and the United Kingdom in 1940. It was the only Polish night fighter squadron in RAF service. No. 307 Squadron was named after the Polish city of Lwów, and was nicknamed "Eagle Owls".

History

The nickname Lwowskie Puchacze (NOM) – "Lwów Eagle Owls" was chosen for the night fighter squadron, as the eagle owl is a nighttime avian predator that is present in Poland. The squadron inherited the traditions of the Polish pre-war 6th Aviation Regiment, that was stationed in Lwów (now Lviv), with a history dating back to the defence of Lwów and Galicia from invading Ukrainian forces in the Polish-Ukrainian War of 1918–1919.

After its formation in Blackpool on 24 August 1940, No. 307 Squadron was assembled at RAF Kirton-in-Lindsey on 5 September 1940 as a night fighter unit, flying the Boulton Paul Defiant turret-fighter. It then took up residence at RAF Jurby, on the Isle of Man. The sole surviving example of the Boulton Paul Defiant, serial number N1671, served in the squadron and can be seen on display at the Royal Air Force Museum Cosford.

In August 1941 the squadron converted to Beaufighters which it flew until being re-equipped with Mosquitoes in December 1942.

Between April 1941 and April 1943 the squadron was based at RAF Clyst Honiton, now Exeter Airport, defending the south-west of England from enemy night bombers. The first Beaufighter victory was on 1 November 1941, when a crew shot down one Dornier Do 217 from II./KG 2 and damaged another (claimed as shot down). That month, two more bombers were shot down and one damaged. However, several of the squadron's aircraft were lost in crashes in the following months, mostly due to weather conditions or the unreliable engines of the Beaufighter Mk IIF variant.

On 3/4 May 1942 when 40 Junkers Ju 88 bombers attacked Exeter as part of the Exeter Blitz of the Baedeker raids there were only three Polish No. 307 Squadron Beaufighters available to defend the city. They managed to intercept and shoot down four of the German bombers that night (all confirmed kills). That month, the squadron re-equipped with the improved Beaufighter Mk VIF. In total, Beaufighter crews shot down fifteen bombers with three probables and six damaged; the last victory was the shooting down of a Do 217 on 24/25 September 1942.

From 1943 the squadron was based at RAF Predannack, Cornwall, and was active as a night intruder unit over airfields in occupied France. This changed in January 1945, when its role was switched to bomber support, combating German night fighters. In 1945-46 it was based at RAF Horsham St Faith near Norwich. The squadron was disbanded on 2 January 1947 after the end of World War II.

Commanding officers

Aircraft operated

Honors
On 15 November 2019, the Polish 307 night fighter squadron was honoured for defending the British city of Exeter from a German blitz campaign during the second World War. A Polish white-and-red flag fluttered over the city in the south-west England honouring the pilots who prevented the complete destruction of Exeter in the 1942 Luftwaffe attack.

See also
  neutral ship attacked
 Polish Air Forces in Great Britain
 Polish contribution to World War II
 List of RAF squadrons

References

Notes

Bibliography

 Delve, Ken. The Source Book of the RAF. Shrewsbury, UK: Airlife Publishing Ltd., 1994. .
 Gretzyngier, Robert. Polish Aces of World War 2, Botley, Oxford, UK: Osprey Publishing, 1998.
 Halley, James J. The Squadrons of the Royal Air Force & Commonwealth, 1918–1988. Tonbridge, Kent, UK: Air Britain (Historians) Ltd., 1988. .
 Jefford, Wing Commander C.G. RAF Squadrons: a Comprehensive Record of the Movement and Equipment of all RAF Squadrons and their Antecedents since 1912. Shrewsbury, UK: Airlife Publishing Ltd., 2001. .
 Rawlings, John D.R. Fighter Squadrons of the RAF and their Aircraft. London: Macdonald and Jane's (Publishers) Ltd., 1969 (Revised edition 1976). .
Janowicz, Krzysztof. Polacy i Beaufightery. "Aeroplan" nr. 5-6/2018 (134–135) (in Polish)

External links

 Detailed information on No. 307 Squadron
 Photo Gallery of No. 307 Squadron 
 History of No.'s 300–318 Squadrons at RAF Web
 Personnel of the Polish Air Force in Great Britain 1940–1947

307
307 Squadron
No. 307
Military units and formations established in 1940
Military units and formations disestablished in 1947
Poland–United Kingdom military relations